Andrzej Kunowski (29 March 1956 – 23 September 2009), known as The Beast of Mława, was a Polish murderer, serial rapist and suspected serial killer. A prolific sex offender in his native country, Kunowski later moved illegally to England, where he murdered 12-year-old Macedonian girl Katerina Koneva in 1997. Sentenced to a whole life order for this crime, he was detained at the HM Prison Frankland until his death in 2009. He remains the prime suspect in the disappearances of three girls between 1992 and 2000, for which he was never charged.

Early life
Andrzej Kunowski was born on 29 March 1956, in Warsaw, Poland. His father was a respected builder who worked on several construction sites, while his mother was a homemaker. While he was still young, the family moved to Mława, after his father was offered an apartment in the city center by the PBRol company, which wanted to hire him. While his parents were regarded as decent, likeable people, Andrzej was considered a nervous, troublesome child who constantly had problems at school and conversing with his peers. As a teenager, he stole some money from his parents' savings book and fled from home, wandering around the country.

Crimes in Poland
Kunowski's first arrest for rape was in 1973, when he was barely 17 years old. As the court believed that the teenager was unlikely to relapse, he was given only three years. Not long after his release, he was brought to trial again, this time for theft, but was given a suspended sentence. Kunowski, who by then was working as an ambulance driver, began raping young girls and women in towns around Warsaw. According to several contemporary Polish newspapers, while driving his ambulance, he would often spot women picking strawberries by the road, whereupon he would stop the car, run into the field and drag his victims to the nearby bushes, where he would rape them. In one instance, it was claimed that he lured one victim by asking for directions from his car and, pretending not to have heard the woman's answer, asked her to lean into the car. When the victim did so, he closed the window on her neck and trapped her, raping her while she was immobilized.

At the time of his arrest and trial in Ciechanów in 1980, Kunowski was charged with attempted murder, 25 rapes, robberies and escape from custody. The prosecutor, Waldemar Smardzewski, requested that the defendant be given the maximum penalty of 25 years imprisonment, expressing his concern that Kunowski's crimes would progressively worsen if he were released. Despite his request, Kunowski was sentenced to 15 years and later paroled in 1991 for good behavior.

During this time, he was a suspect in the disappearance of 14-year-old student Agnieszka Grzybicka, who mysteriously vanished after finishing her lessons at the one of the primary schools in Mława. Despite a joint effort by local resident and the police to locate her, Grzybicka was never found, leading some to believe that she had been abducted and killed. As part of the inquiry, both Kunowski and Leszek Pękalski were questioned, but neither was charged in the case. Kunowski was arrested again in 1995 on charges of raping two girls. After remaining in custody for two years, he complained of an obstructed artery, which was confirmed during a medical examination. As a result, the courts issued that he temporarily released for treatment. However, Kunowski, who had sold his flat in Mława the previous year, used the money to buy himself a fake passport and flee to England.

Murder of Katerina Koneva
Using his fake passport, Kunowski found himself a job as a dry cleaner in Acton, London. Only a few months after his arrival, he began stalking girls in the area, but each time was unsuccessful in raping them. On May 22, 1997, he found a new target: 12-year-old Macedonian immigrant Katerina Koneva, who lived together with her parents in Hammersmith. After following Koneva to her home, Kunowski broke in and jammed the door with a chair in order to prevent anyone from barging in. He choked the young girl with a cord, but was interrupted by the girl's father, Trajce, who saw him through a crack in the door.

Kunowski jumped out of a window and ran with Konev trying to chase him down. Kunowski threatened to stab him with a knife, carjacked a nearby woman and fled. Konev attempted to save his daughter, successfully cutting the cord wrapped around her neck, but police and the paramedics were unable to save the girl’s life. Shortly after the murder, Scotland Yard announced a 20,000 pound reward for any information that may lead to the capture of Katerina Koneva's killer. After examining the crime scene, they found hairs and fingerprints belonging to the unidentified assailant, but for the time being, were unable to connect them to the killer.

Suspected victims
While no crimes have been definitely linked back to Kunowski in the period between 1997 until his final arrest in 2002, he has been proposed as the prime suspects in the disappearances of two women, both of whom disappeared in the vicinity of Ealing. The first of them was 19-year-old University of West London student Elizabeth Chau, who vanished in April 1999, followed not long after by 27-year-old Lola Shenkoya, who disappeared a few months later while walking home from her workplace.

Arrest, trial and imprisonment
In 2002, Kunowski returned to his criminal habits, luring a 21-year-old Korean student to his Acton apartment, ostensibly to sell it to her. When she entered, he began choking and raping her, but his victim survived and later told the authorities about her attacker. Kunowski was quickly located and arrested, and after a short trial, sentenced to 9 years imprisonment for rape. While in prison, his DNA was uploaded in a police database to check if he could be linked to any unsolved crimes. As a result, Kunowski's DNA and fingerprints were positively linked to the cardigan worn by Katerina Koneva. Following this revelation, the case caused a media frenzy, demanding further investigation into the criminal's past. The English authorities began interviewing Kunowski, who confessed to them that he was on the run from Polish police on charges of rape, and after cross-checking his claims, his extensive record of rapes dating back to the 1970s was revealed to the public.

In March 2004, Kunowski was brought to trial at the Old Bailey for the murder of Koneva, where he was found guilty on all charges and swiftly sentenced to a whole life order, without any chance of ever being paroled. Following his conviction, he was labeled by several members of the prosecution and police force as one of the most dangerous and prolific sex offenders they have ever come across.

Death
Andrzej Kunowski died in HM Prison Frankland on 23 September 2009, from heart failure. Shortly after his death, an appeal was made to the public in an effort to possibly connect him to any further rapes or murders committed in England, but as of 2021, no new developments have come forward.

See also
 List of serial rapists
 List of prisoners with whole life orders

In the media
 An episode for the fourth season of Britain's Most Evil Killers was dedicated to the case.

References

1956 births
2009 deaths
1990s crimes in London
2000s crimes in London
2000s trials
20th-century Polish criminals
21st-century Polish criminals
Male murderers
Murder trials
People convicted of child pornography offenses
People from Warsaw
Polish male criminals
Polish murderers of children
Polish people convicted of rape
Polish people imprisoned abroad
Polish people who died in prison custody
Polish prisoners sentenced to life imprisonment
Prisoners sentenced to life imprisonment by the United Kingdom
Prisoners who died in England and Wales detention
Rape trials
Suspected serial killers
Trials in London
Violence against children in London
Violence against women in London